Elterlein is a town in the district of Erzgebirgskreis, in Saxony, Germany. It is situated in the Ore Mountains, 10 km west of Annaberg-Buchholz. It consists of the divisions Elterlein, Hermannsdorf and Schwarzbach.

History
From 1952 to 1990, Elterlein was part of the Bezirk Karl-Marx-Stadt of East Germany.

Notable people
 Wolfgang Uhle (1512–1594), known as the plague priest of Annaberg
 Karl Weinhold (born 1946), politician (CDU), Member of Landtag, mayor of Elterlein (1990–2009)
 Christian Gotthold Hoffmann (1713–1784), scientist

References 

Erzgebirgskreis